"Both Sides of the Story" is a song performed by English drummer Phil Collins. The song was released in October 1993 as the lead single from his fifth album, Both Sides, released the same year. The song reached number seven on the UK Singles Chart and number 25 on the US Billboard Hot 100. It charted the highest in Canada, peaking at number two on the RPM Top Singles chart. The single's B-sides vary, as copies of the single include either "Always" or "Rad Dudeski".

Music video
The video, mainly shot in New York, follows the lyrics of the song. The first section cuts between Collins singing and images of a gutter and homeless people. The second section shows Collins inside a house, sitting on the stairs. He watches a married couple arguing, while their children watch. After the chorus, a military unit is shown patrolling a town while children spray-paint the walls. The final section portrays the story of a confrontation with a ghetto kid threatening another man with a gun. (This scene was inspired by the 1991 Lawrence Kasdan film Grand Canyon.) The video ends with shots of New York and the people, cutting like the first section, again with Collins singing the closing lyrics.

Personnel 
 Phil Collins – lead and backing vocals, keyboards, guitars, bass, drums, drum machine

Charts

Weekly charts

Year-end charts

References

1993 singles
1993 songs
Atlantic Records singles
Phil Collins songs
Song recordings produced by Phil Collins
Songs written by Phil Collins
Virgin Records singles
Warner Music Group singles